Halarsenatibacter is a Gram-negative, strictly anaerobic and motile genus of bacteria from the family of Halanaerobiaceae with one known species (Halarsenatibacter silvermanii). Halarsenatibacter silvermanii has been isolate from the Searles Lake.

See also
 List of bacterial orders
 List of bacteria genera

References

Clostridia
Bacteria genera
Taxa described in 2010
Monotypic bacteria genera